NH 87 may refer to:

 National Highway 87 (India)
 New Hampshire Route 87, United States